Pathashaala PCFL-KFI (Palar Centre For Learning, Krishnamurti Foundation India)   is a residential school situated in Kanchipuram district, Tamil Nadu, and was established in 2010. The campus uses energy sparingly and is designed with solar energy and a windmill. The school has been designed as a zero-blackwater campus by the use of dry composting toilets. The school has about 120 students.

See also
 List of schools in India
 The Walden School Hyderabad
 The School at The Pathless Land
 Rishi Valley School
 The Valley School

References

Further reading
About Pathashaala- Bhoomi Magazine Jan 2015

E Mag Oct 2015

Compost Harvesting on Gandhi Jayanti 2015

External links 
 , the school's official website

Co-educational boarding schools
Co-educational schools in India
Boarding schools in Tamil Nadu
Private schools in Tamil Nadu
Schools in Kanchipuram district
Educational institutions established in 2010
2010 establishments in Tamil Nadu
Jiddu Krishnamurti schools